Natalie Gold is an American actress who has appeared in film, television, and stage productions, including on Broadway. She is best known for playing Rava Roy on the TV show Succession and Julia Harwell on the TV show Rubicon, as well as for appearing in films including Before the Devil Knows You're Dead, I Don't Know How She Does It, and Love & Other Drugs.

Gold grew up in Miami, Florida, and studied theatre at the New World School of the Arts and Emerson College.

Filmography

Film

Television

References

External links
 About the Artists: Natalie Gold
 
 
 

Living people
American film actresses
American stage actresses
American television actresses
Actresses from Miami
21st-century American actresses
Emerson College alumni
Year of birth missing (living people)